Alessandro Butti (b. 1893 – d. 1959 in Turin) was an Italian type designer who lived and worked mostly in Turin where he was art director of the Nebiolo type foundry. He also taught at the Scuola Vigliani-Paravia.  Microgramma is his most famous face.  After Butti's death, his collaborator on that face, Aldo Novarese, added a lower case which was then called Eurostile.

Fonts designed by Alessandro Butti

References
Jaspert, W. Pincus, W. Turner Berry and A.F. Johnson. The Encyclopedia of Type Faces. Blandford Press Lts.: 1953, 1983. .
Friedl, Ott, and Stein, Typography: an Encyclopedic Survey of Type Design and Techniques Throughout History. Black Dog & Levinthal Publishers: 1998. .
Font Designer - Alessandro Butti
MyFonts - Alessandro Butti

1893 births
1959 deaths
Italian art directors
Italian graphic designers
Italian typographers and type designers